Rabštejnská Lhota is a municipality and village in Chrudim District in the Pardubice Region of the Czech Republic. It has about 800 inhabitants.

Administrative parts
Villages of Rabštejn and Smrkový Týnec are administrative parts of Rabštejnská Lhota.

Sights
Ruins of Rabštejnek Castle lie next to Rabštejn.

References

External links

Villages in Chrudim District